The 1999 Mid Sussex District Council election took place on 6 May 1999 to elect members of Mid Sussex District Council in West Sussex, England. One third of the council was up for election and the Conservative Party gained overall control of the council from no overall control.

After the election, the composition of the council was:
Conservative 29
Liberal Democrat 21
Labour 2
Independent 2

Ward results

References

1999
Mid Sussex District Council elections
1990s in West Sussex